The Shafer Commission, formally known as the National Commission on Marihuana and Drug Abuse, was appointed by U.S. President Richard Nixon in the early 1970s.  Its chairman was former Pennsylvania Governor Raymond P. Shafer.  The commission issued a report on its findings in 1972 that called for the decriminalization of marijuana possession in the United States. The report was ignored by the White House, but is an important document against prohibition.
 
While the Controlled Substances Act was being drafted in a House committee in 1970, Assistant Secretary of Health Roger O. Egeberg had recommended that marijuana temporarily be placed in Schedule I, the most restrictive category of drugs, pending the Commission's report. On March 22, 1972, the Commission's chairman, Raymond P. Shafer, presented a report to Congress and the public entitled "Marihuana, a Signal of Misunderstanding," which favored ending marijuana prohibition and adopting other methods to discourage use. The report was republished as a Signet Books New American Library paperback in 1972.

The Commission's report said that while public sentiment tended to view marijuana users as dangerous, they actually found users to be more timid, drowsy and passive. It concluded that cannabis did not cause widespread danger to society. It recommended using social measures other than criminalization to discourage use. It compared the situation of cannabis to that of alcohol.

The Commission's proposed decriminalization of marijuana possession was opposed, in 1974, by the recommendations of a congressional subcommittee chaired by Senator James Eastland.

The Nixon administration did not implement the recommendations from the National Commission on Marihuana and Drug Abuse. However, the report has frequently been cited by individuals supporting removal of cannabis from Schedule I of the Controlled Substances Act.

Members

Michael R. Sonnenreich served as Executive Director of the Commission.
Raymond P. Shafer, former Governor of Pennsylvania (Chairman)
Dana L. Farnsworth, MD, chairman of the University of Michigan department of pharmacology (Vice Chairman)
Henry Brill, MD, psychiatrist
Tim Lee Carter, U.S. Representative (R–KY)
Joan Ganz Cooney, television producer
Charles O. Galvin, SJD, Dean of SMU Law School
John A. Howard, PhD, President of Rockford University
Harold E. Hughes, U.S. Senator (D–IA)
Jacob K. Javits, U.S. Senator (R–NY)
Paul G. Rogers, U.S. Representative (D–FL)
Maurice H. Seevers, MD, PhD
J. Thomas Ungerleider, MD, psychiatrist
Mitchell Ware, JD, attorney

References

Further reading

Marihuana, A Signal of Misunderstanding, Commissioned by President Richard M. Nixon, March 1972.
The First Report of the National Commission on Marihuana (1972): Signal Of Misunderstanding Or Exercise In Ambiguity, Response article to the Shafer Commission report, by Gabriel G. Nahas and Albert Greenwood, published in the Bulletin of the New York Academy of Medicine, Vol. 50 No. 1, January 1974. From the US National Library of Medicine.

1970s in the United States
1972 in cannabis
Cannabis law reform in the United States
Cannabis research
Drug control law in the United States
United States national commissions